Subutay Kesgin, better known by his stage name Azer Bülbül (b. 1 February 1969 – d. 6 January 2012), the most famous of Idealistic ideology politics was a prominent Turkish folk music artist and actor.

Biography 
Azer Bülbül was born Subutay Kesgin in Akyaka, Kars in Azerbaijan Turkish Karapapak family. After moving to Leipzig with his family, Bülbül started his music career, releasing his debut album Garip Yolcu in 1984. After releasing a string of folk music albums, he achieved commercial success with his 1994 album, Ben Babayım. On 15 February 2001, he was convicted for drug-related charges and released on bail. In 2011, he stated that he was rehabilitated and had been clean for 18 months.
Bülbül died of a heart attack on 6 January 2012 in Antalya. He was found dead in his hotel room and was buried in Hadımköy Cemetery in Istanbul.

Personal life 
Azer Bülbül was married once and later divorced. He did not have any children. Bülbül also proposed to Oya Aydoğan but she refused his marriage offer.

Discography 
 1984: Garip Yolcu 
 1986: Esmerin Adı Oya (feat. Oya Aydoğan and İbrahim Tatlıses)
 1987: Yalan Olur 
 1987: Yoruldum 
 1988: Güzel Kız 
 1989: Fırat 
 1989: Yürüyorum 
 1990: Ben Sana Vurgunum 
 1992: Bir Yudum Su
 1993: Dağlara Yolculuk 
 1994  Ben Babayım & Yaralandın mı Ey Can
 1995: Ağıt 
 1996: Doğudan Esintiler (Ft.). Seyfi Doğanay 
 1996: Eline Düştüm (Ft.). Müslüm Gürses 
 1996: Yine Düştün Aklıma (Ft.) Müslüm Gürses & Mustafa Keser
 1997: Hayatımın Şarkıları 
 1998: Zordayım & Canım Yanıyor 
 1999: Kör Kurşun & Sana Yalan Gelebilir 
 2000: Dünden Bugüne 
 2001: Bana Düştü & Neden Dedo 
 2001: Yalan Sevgiler
 2002: Başımda Bela Var 
 2004: Ateş Düştüğü Yeri Yakar 
 2005: Seçmeler 
 2006: Üzülmedim ki 
 2007: Kalemin Kırıldı 
 2011: Duygularım

Filmography 
 2012: Seninki Kaç Para 
 2008: Vefa Borcu
 2008: Arkadaş
 2002: Rus Gelin
 1998: Bedel
 1985: Mavi Mavi Masmavi

References 

1969 births
2012 deaths
Bağlama players
Burials in Istanbul by place
Causes of death
Composers for pedal piano
People from Arpaçay
Turkish composers
Turkish classical violinists
Turkish expatriates in West Germany
Turkish film score composers
Turkish folk musicians
Turkish folk-pop singers
Turkish lyricists
Turkish drummers
Turkish male television actors
Turkish male film actors
Turkish male songwriters
Turkish people convicted of drug offenses
Turkish oud players
Turkish Sunni Muslims
21st-century Turkish male musicians
20th-century Turkish male musicians
20th-century Turkish male actors
21st-century Turkish male actors